The canton of Lavardac is an administrative division of the Lot-et-Garonne department, southwestern France. Its borders were modified at the French canton reorganisation which came into effect in March 2015. Its seat is in Lavardac.

It consists of the following communes:
 
Ambrus
Barbaste
Bruch
Buzet-sur-Baïse
Damazan
Feugarolles
Lavardac
Monheurt
Montesquieu
Montgaillard-en-Albret
Pompiey
Puch-d'Agenais
Razimet
Saint-Laurent
Saint-Léger
Saint-Léon
Saint-Pierre-de-Buzet
Thouars-sur-Garonne
Vianne
Xaintrailles

References

Cantons of Lot-et-Garonne